Gerald Harris (born November 19, 1979) is an American retired mixed martial artist who most recently fought in Bellator. He was a cast member of Spike TV's The Ultimate Fighter 7 and has also competed in World Series of Fighting, the UFC, DREAM, the Portland Wolfpack in the IFL, Shark Fights, Tachi Palace Fights, and Legacy Fighting Championship.

Early life
Gerald Harris attended East Central High School in Tulsa, Oklahoma, then wrestled in college for Cleveland State University where he owns the all-time record for wins on the wrestling team. Also while attending CSU, Harris was a member of the Alpha Phi Alpha fraternity.

Mixed martial arts 
Harris stumbled into mixed martial arts by accident after a friend convinced him to do it for fun and with Harris needing money, he agreed. He took an exhibition fight for $200, with the money he bought a "ragged Mustang to get around town." He beat his opponent so badly that he was invited to join the tournament and thus his professional fighting career began in August 2006. Harris won his first five matches before losing a controversial split decision to Fabio Leopoldo in his IFL debut.

After being on The Ultimate Fighter, Gerald went to train with Rampage Jackson for five weeks in Liverpool, England, and was very close to signing with Bellator Fighting Championships and taking part in their first season middleweight tournament.

When Gerald fell into financial problems, he was forced to move with his mother to Arizona, resulting in Gerald asking to be cut from his fight team, Team Quest. In Arizona he began training with C.B. Dollaway, Jamie Varner and Ryan Bader at Arizona Combat Sports. He left the team not long after starting and moved to Denver, Colorado to train with Trevor Wittman at the Grudge Training Center.

The Ultimate Fighter 
Harris was on the Spike TV reality show The Ultimate Fighter as a member of Team Rampage. He got on the show by defeating Mike Madallo  but lost by knockout in the second round to Amir Sadollah, who was the eventual winner of that season.

Ultimate Fighting Championship
Harris was signed to the UFC after calling into MMA Junkie Radio with the special guest being President of the UFC, Dana White. Harris called the show, changing his voice, and began praising himself in the third person. Finally, Harris came out and identified himself, then he informed White of his desire to fight for the promotion and told him of his current winning streak. White congratulated Harris and told him to call the office for a talk, the talk entailed getting Harris signed to a four fight deal with the UFC.

He was set to make his debut for the UFC against Mike Massenzio on January 11, 2010 at UFC Fight Night 20, replacing an injured Tim Credeur. Instead he fought John Salter, who stepped in for the injured Massenzio. He would later go on to defeat Salter by TKO in the third round and win Knockout of the Night.

In his second appearance in the UFC, he fought on the UFC Fight Night 21 card against recent signing Mario Miranda. The fight took place March 31, 2010 in Charlotte, North Carolina. Harris won the fight by TKO due to punches in the first round.

Harris next faced Renzo Gracie BJJ black belt, David Branch, on the under card of UFC 116. Harris won via knockout after a brutal slam at 3:25 of the third round. The knockout was awarded "Knockout of the Night," giving Harris his second post fight bonus and an extra $75,000 to his pay. The knockout was also shown on numerous sport's highlight shows, including ESPN's Sportscenter.

Harris was expected to face Alessio Sakara on August 28, 2010 at UFC 118, replacing an injured Jorge Rivera. However, Sakara was also forced off the card with an injury and replaced by Joe Vedepo. Then on August 18, it was announced that the Harris/Vedepo bout had been scrapped from the card. Harris was brought in as an alternative for the week of the event, and was given a fight purse for dieting, training and flying out to Boston.

Once again, Harris faced a UFC newcomer in Maiquel Falcão on November 20, 2010 at UFC 123  Harris lost the fight via unanimous decision and in a surprising move to many observers,  was subsequently released by the promotion despite having won all 3 of his fights in it.

Post UFC
Following his release, Harris fought James Head on February 11, 2011 for Oklahoma's Xtreme Fight Night MMA. The fight was back and forth throughout the three rounds. Harris lost the fight via decision.

Harris then fought at Tachi Palace Fights 9 against journeyman Anthony Ruiz. He went on to win that fight via unanimous decision, and ended up breaking his hand in the process.

DREAM/ Legacy FC
On July 25, 2011, Harris announced on his personal Twitter that he had signed a multi-fight deal with Japanese promotion, DREAM. In his debut, Harris faced fellow UFC veteran Kazuhiro Nakamura at Dream 17. He won the fight via split decision.

Harris fought Eric Davila on Feb. 24, 2012 in the main event of Legacy Fighting Championship 10.  He won the fight via unanimous decision.

Harris fought Mike Bronzoulis in his welterweight debut on May 11, 2012 at Legacy Fighting Championship 11. He defeated Bronzoulis by split decision.

World Series of Fighting
Harris signed with World Series of Fighting in late 2012 and made his promotional debut at WSOF 1 on November 3, 2012 against Josh Burkman. Harris lost the fight via unanimous decision.

In his second fight with the promotion, Harris fought Jorge Santiago at WSOF 4.  The bout had a confusing first round where Harris slammed Santiago and believed he had tapped.  However, the referee was stopping the action to deduct a point from Santiago for blatantly grabbing the cage during Harris' slam. Despite the confusion, Harris went on to win the fight via unanimous decision.

Harris announced his retirement from MMA on April 22, 2014.

MMA return
After two-and-a-half years away from the sport, Harris returned to active competition in December 2016.  He faced Aaron Cobb at Legacy Fighting Championship 63 on December 2, 2016.  What was originally scheduled to be a welterweight bout turned into a heavyweight bout after Cobb missed weight by showing up more than 50 pounds above the welterweight limit.  Harris won the fight via knockout due to a slam in the first minute of the first round.

On October 21, 2017, Harris stepped into the cage for his last professional fight against Matt McKeon at Xtreme Fight Night at Tulsa Oklahoma. He went into retirement with a win via a violent slam.

Bellator MMA
Harris stepped in as a last-minute replaced for John Salter against Rafael Lovato Jr. at Bellator 198 on April 28, 2018. Due to the lateness of the booking, the bout was contested at a catchweight of 188 pounds. Harris lost the bout via submission in the first round. Soon after the Lovato fight, Harris signed a multi-fight deal with Bellator.

In his second fight for the promotion, Harris faced Yaroslav Amosov at Bellator 202 on July 13, 2018, losing via unanimous decision.

Harris faced Anatoly Tokov at Bellator 218 on March 22, 2019. Harris managed to drop Tokov during the fight, but Tokov recovered and eventually submitted Harris via ten-finger guillotine choke. Following the loss, Harris announced that the fight was the last fight of his contract, and retired for the second time in his career.

Despite retiring earlier in 2019, Harris returned to the competition again with hopes to jumpstart his career and faced Seth Baczynski at C3 Fights 48 on November 23, 2019. He won the fight via unanimous decision and once again declared his retirement from the sport.

Personal life 
Gerald's brother Corey was killed in March 2009. A teenage driver making a quick left turn had collided with his motorcycle, killing him instantly. Despite this Gerald fought 7 days later and dedicated his victory to his brother. 
Gerald Harris also teaches Social Studies at Union High School in Tulsa, OK.

Harris is married to his wife Nicci and they have a blended family of 8 children.  Previously in an interview, Harris revealed that his biological children were taken away from him the weekend he fought Josh Burkman in 2012 during his divorce which was eventually overturned and he regained custody. In that same interview he said that he actually didn't retire from the sport in 2013, but was forced on a hiatus due to the ongoing divorce and custody issues but is now happily married.

Championships and achievements

Collegiate wrestling
Cleveland State University
Class of 2013 Athletic Hall of Fame (Wrestling)

Mixed martial arts
Freestyle Cage Fighting
FCF Middleweight Championship (Two times)
Titan Fighting Championship
TFC Middleweight Championship (One time)
Xtreme Fight Night
Welterweight Championship
Shark Fights
Shark Fights Middleweight Championship (One time, current)
Ultimate Fighting Championship
Knockout of the Night (Two times) vs. John Salter, David Branch 
USA Today
2010 Knockout of the Year vs. David Branch on July 3

Mixed martial arts record 

|-
| Win
| align=center|26–8–1
| Seth Baczynski
| Decision (unanimous)
| C3 Fights 48
| 
| align=center| 3
| align=center| 5:00
| Newkirk, Oklahoma, United States
| 
|-
| Loss
| align=center|25–8–1
| Anatoly Tokov
| Submission (guillotine choke)
| Bellator 218
| 
| align=center| 2
| align=center| 0:37
| Thackerville, Oklahoma, United States
| 
|-
|Draw
|align=center|
|Hracho Darpinyan
|Draw (majority)
|Bellator 210
|
|align=center|3
|align=center|5:00
|Thackerville, Oklahoma, United States
|
|-
|Loss
|align=center|25–7
|Yaroslav Amosov
|Decision (unanimous)
|Bellator 202
|
|align=center| 3
|align=center| 5:00
|Thackerville, Oklahoma, United States
|
|-
|Loss
|align=center|25–6
|Rafael Lovato Jr.
|Submission (armbar)
|Bellator 198
|
|align=center| 1
|align=center| 1:11
|Rosemont, Illinois, United States
|
|-
|Win
|align=center|25–5
|Matt McKeon
|KO (slam)
|Xtreme Fight Night 344
|
|align=center| 4
|align=center| 2:22
|Tulsa, Oklahoma, United States
|
|-
|Win
|align=center|24–5
|Brian Green
|Decision (unanimous)
|Xtreme Fight Night 343
|
|align=center| 3
|align=center| 5:00
|Tulsa, Oklahoma, United States
|
|-
|Win
|align=center|23–5
|Aaron Cobb
|KO (slam)
|Legacy Fighting Championship 63
|
|align=center| 1
|align=center| 0:43
|Tulsa, Oklahoma, United States
|
|-
| Win
| align=center| 22–5
| Jorge Santiago
| Decision (unanimous)
| WSOF 4
| 
| align=center| 3
| align=center| 5:00
| Ontario, California, United States
| 
|-
| Loss
| align=center| 21–5
| Josh Burkman
| Decision (unanimous)
| WSOF 1
| 
| align=center| 3
| align=center| 5:00
| Las Vegas, Nevada, United States
|
|-
| Win
| align=center| 21–4
| Mike Bronzoulis
| Decision (split)
| Legacy Fighting Championship  11
| 
| align=center| 3
| align=center| 5:00
| Houston, Texas, United States
| 
|-
| Win
| align=center| 20–4
| Eric Davila
| Decision (unanimous)
| Legacy Fighting Championship 10
| 
| align=center| 3
| align=center| 5:00
| Houston, Texas, United States
| 
|-
| Win
| align=center| 19–4
| Kazuhiro Nakamura
| Decision (split)
| Dream 17
| 
| align=center| 3
| align=center| 5:00
| Saitama, Japan
| 
|-
| Win
| align=center| 18–4
| Anthony Ruiz
| Decision (unanimous)
| Tachi Palace Fights 9
| 
| align=center| 3
| align=center| 5:00
| Lemoore, California, United States
| 
|-
| Loss
| align=center| 17–4
| James Head
| Decision (unanimous)
| Xtreme Fight Night 2: Harris vs. Head
| 
| align=center| 3
| align=center| 5:00
| Tulsa, Oklahoma, United States
| 
|-
| Loss
| align=center| 17–3
| Maiquel Falcão
| Decision (unanimous)
| UFC 123
| 
| align=center| 3
| align=center| 5:00
| Auburn Hills, Michigan, United States
| 
|-
| Win
| align=center| 17–2
| David Branch
| KO (slam)
| UFC 116
| 
| align=center| 3
| align=center| 2:35
| Las Vegas, Nevada, United States
| 
|-
| Win
| align=center| 16–2
| Mario Miranda
| TKO (punches)
| UFC Fight Night: Florian vs. Gomi
| 
| align=center| 1
| align=center| 4:49
| Charlotte, North Carolina, United States
| 
|-
| Win
| align=center| 15–2
| John Salter
| TKO (punches)
| UFC Fight Night: Maynard vs. Diaz
| 
| align=center| 3
| align=center| 3:24
| Fairfax, Virginia, United States
| 
|-
| Win
| align=center| 14–2
| Nissen Osterneck
| KO (punch)
| Shark Fights 6: Stars & Stripes
| 
| align=center| 1
| align=center| 0:46
| Amarillo, Texas, United States
| 
|-
| Win
| align=center| 13–2
| David Knight
| KO (punches)
| Slammin Jammin Weekend 2
| 
| align=center| 1
| align=center| 1:38
| Red Rock, Oklahoma, United States
| 
|-
| Win
| align=center| 12–2
| Travis Doerge
| Submission (guillotine choke)
| C3 Fights: Knockout Rockout Weekend
| 
| align=center| 1
| align=center| 2:32
| Clinton, Oklahoma, United States
| 
|-
| Win
| align=center| 11–2
| Jay Ford
| TKO (submission to punches)
| Freestyle Cage Fighting 25
| 
| align=center| 1
| align=center| 3:43
| Tulsa, Oklahoma, United States
| 
|-
| Win
| align=center| 10–2
| Mitch Whitesel
| Decision (unanimous)
| C3 Fights: Showdown 2
| 
| align=center| 3
| align=center| 5:00
| Cherokee, North Carolina, United States
| 
|-
| Win
| align=center| 9–2
| Brandon McDowell
| TKO (submission to punches)
| C3 Fights: Battle on the Border 2
| 
| align=center| 1
| align=center| 1:21
| Newkirk, Oklahoma, United States
| 
|-
| Win
| align=center| 8–2
| Jeremija Sanders
| TKO (punches)
| FTP: Global Showdown
| 
| align=center| 1
| align=center| 0:30
| Thackerville, Oklahoma, United States
| 
|-
| Loss
| align=center| 7–2
| Benji Radach
| TKO (punches)
| IFL: 2007 Semifinals
| 
| align=center| 1
| align=center| 3:03
| East Rutherford, New Jersey, United States
| 
|-
| Loss
| align=center| 7–1
| Fabio Leopoldo
| Decision (split)
| IFL: Connecticut
| 
| align=center| 3
| align=center| 4:00
| Uncasville, Connecticut, United States
| 
|-
| Win
| align=center| 7–0
| Curtis Stout
| KO (slam and punches)
| Titan FC 7
| 
| align=center| 1
| align=center| 4:57
| Kansas City, Kansas, United States
| 
|-
| Win
| align=center| 6–0
| Travis Fowler
| Decision (unanimous)
| Freestyle Cage Fighting 9
| 
| align=center| 3
| align=center| 5:00
| Ponca City, Oklahoma, United States
| 
|-
| Win
| align=center| 5–0
| Harvell Hunter
| KO (punches)
| Freestyle Cage Fighting 8
| 
| align=center| 1
| align=center| N/A
| Ponca City, Oklahoma, United States
| 
|-
| Win
| align=center| 4–0
| Bubba McDaniel
| TKO (slam)
| Freestyle Cage Fighting 6
| 
| align=center| 2
| align=center| 4:55
| Tulsa, Oklahoma, United States
| 
|-
| Win
| align=center| 3–0
| Joe Bunch
| TKO (punches)
| FCF: Brawl For It All
| 
| align=center| 2
| align=center| 1:58
| Tulsa, Oklahoma, United States
| 
|-
| Win
| align=center| 2–0
| Chester Lauchner
| Submission (verbal)
| FCF: Brawl For It All
| 
| align=center| 2
| align=center| 1:06
| Tulsa, Oklahoma, United States
| 
|-
| Win
| align=center| 1–0
| Ryan Lopez
| TKO (submission to punches)
| FCFP: Friday Night Fights
| 
| align=center| 2
| align=center| 0:49
| Oklahoma City, Oklahoma, United States
|

Mixed martial arts exhibition record 

|-
| Loss
| align=center|1-1
| Amir Sadollah
| TKO (punches)
| The Ultimate Fighter: Team Rampage vs Team Forrest
| 
| align=center| 2
| align=center| 2:36
| Las Vegas, Nevada, United States
| 
|-
| Win
| align=center|1–0
| Mike Madallo
| Decision (Unanimous)
| The Ultimate Fighter: Team Rampage vs Team Forrest
| 
| align=center| 2
| align=center| 5:00
| Las Vegas, Nevada, United States
|

References

External links 
 
 
 
 
 

Living people
1979 births
21st-century American comedians
American male mixed martial artists
Mixed martial artists from Oklahoma
Middleweight mixed martial artists
Mixed martial artists utilizing collegiate wrestling
Sportspeople from Tulsa, Oklahoma
Sportspeople from Portland, Oregon
African-American mixed martial artists
Ultimate Fighting Championship male fighters
21st-century African-American sportspeople
20th-century African-American sportspeople